Friends is a studio album by American singer Dionne Warwick. It was released by Arista Records on November 25, 1985 in the United States. Her seventh album with the label, it was executive produced by Clive Davis, who consulted frequent collaborators Burt Bacharach, Carole Bayer Sager, Albhy Galuten, Barry Manilow, and Stevie Wonder as well as Narada Michael Walden and David Foster to work with Warwick.

Following a series of lukewarm commercial successes, Friends marked a return to form for Warwick. Her highest-charting album since Dionne (1979), it peaked at number 12 on the US Billboard 200 and went gold in Canada and the US. At the 1987 Grammy Awards, the album was nominated for Best Pop Vocal Performance, Female. Friends yielded the worldwide top ten single "That's What Friends Are For", which became Warwick's biggest US hit, spending four weeks at number one on the Billboard Hot 100. A second single, "Whisper in the Dark", was released in 1986.

Track listing

Charts

Weekly charts

Year-end charts

Certifications

References

External links
Friends at Discogs

1985 albums
Dionne Warwick albums
Albums produced by Clive Davis
Albums produced by David Foster
Albums produced by Stevie Wonder
Albums produced by Burt Bacharach
albums produced by Narada Michael Walden
Arista Records albums